Augusto Ferrer-Dalmau Nieto (Barcelona, 20 January 1964) is a Spanish hyperrealist painter who specialises in historical military paintings that portray different eras of the Spanish Armed Forces through hyperrealistic naturalism. On January 11, 2022, he presented the Ferrer-Dalmau Foundation with the aim of promoting defense culture through history and art.

Biography and work 

Augusto Ferrer-Dalmau Nieto was born in Barcelona in a family of the Catalan bourgeoisie linked to Carlism (he is the great-nephew of the Carlist journalist and historian Melchor Ferrer Dalmau). He studied at the Jesuit college of San Ignacio in Sarriá. At the end of the 1980s he worked as a textile designer for different firms, always maintaining his passion for oil painting. His vocation for military and history also led him to paint this subject from a very young age and write a book (Batallón Román), although his first independent and self-taught works were landscapes, especially seascapes.

Later, inspired by the work of Antonio López García, he focused on urban environments and captured in his canvases the spots of his native Barcelona. He exhibited in art galleries, and garnered hits and good reviews. The work of this time is collected in a monograph of the author and in several general books of contemporary art. At the end of the 1990s he decided to specialize in the historical-military theme and began to produce canvases where the landscape is mixed with military elements such as soldiers and cavalry.

Installed in Madrid since 2010, he has collaborated with different publishers, associations, institutions, and specialized entities in the recreation of the military history of Spain. Different monographic books on his painting have been published. A man committed to culture and art, he founded his own magazine, FD (Ferrer-Dalmau) Magazine, in which he approaches the history of Spain and its people from an artistic and social perspective. His work and diffusion is managed by the company Historical Outline, and his paintings illustrate numerous books, covers, and magazines, especially of history.

Ferrer-Dalmau has been in the zone of operations of an international conflict like Afghanistan, Iraq, Syria, Mali and Lebanon, making sketches, taking notes and painting, while living with the Spanish ISAF troops in 2012 and in 2014 in the province of Helmand with the Georgian Armed Forces. The painter shared experiences with the ASPFOR XXXI contingent, trained at the base of the Parachute Brigade, at Qala i Naw and at the Ricketts Combat Outpost (COP) in Moqur. It is the first time that a Spanish painter goes to a mission abroad to collaborate with the Ministry of Defense of Spain. However, it is not an exceptional practice because other armies have war artists, such as the US Marine Corps, which currently has three official artists, one of them Michael D. Fay, president of The International Society of War Artists, of which Ferrer-Dalmau is a member. The painter made his work The patrol (La Patrulla)' as homage to the Spanish soldiers. In May 2016 he was painting the Spanish troops in the mission of Lebanon., in April 2018 with the Spanish Army in the European Union Training Mission in Mali (EUTM-Mali), in September 2018 in Aleppo (Syria) with the Army of the Russian Federation  and in November 2019 he was painting the Spanish troops in Iraq.

Art exhibitions 
In addition to private collections, his work can be seen in different museums, such as the Museum of the Royal Guard (Royal Palace of El Pardo, Madrid), the Army Museum, the Museum of the General Military Academy (Zaragoza), the Naval Museum of Madrid, the Museum of Intendance (Avila), the Naval Military Academy of Marín (Pontevedra), and the Museum of Modern Art of the Republic of Georgia, can also be seen in the Royal Palace of Valladolid.

Throughout his professional career he has held individual exhibitions in private galleries in Barcelona, Madrid, London, Paris and New York and institutional centers such as:

 Army Museum of Toledo 
 Palacio de Capitanía
 Royal Palace of Valladolid
 Audience Palace of Soria,
 :es:Museo Provincial de Pontevedra,
 Sant Ferran Castle of Figueras
 Palacio de Buenavista of Madrid,
 Palace of the Captaincy of Canarias en Tenerife,
 Militar Palace of Las Palmas de Gran Canaria,
 Castle of Santa Catalina in Cádiz
 Palace of the Captaincy of Barcelona.
 Palacio de los Concejos of Madrid,
 Provincial Palace of Alicante,
 Town Hall of Valladolid,
 Miramar Palace (San Sebastián),
 Roman Museum Oiasso of Irún, 
 Palace of the Captaincy of A Coruña,
 Palace of the Cigüeñas of Cáceres,
 Cultural Centre of Amaia (Irún),
 International Conference on Defense and Security (Georgia),
 Exhibition of the "Camino Español" in Strasbourg, Brussels, Besançon and Breda,
 General Command of Ceuta, 
 Oratory Sant Felipe Neri of Cordova,
 Museum of the Battle (Bailen),
 Consistorial House of Valladolid,
 Palace of the Captaincy of Badajoz.
 Sant Agustin Cultural Center of El Burgo de Osma.
 House of America (Madrid)
 Palace of the Captaincy of Burgos,
 Bolduque Church (Holand)
 Saint Barbara Palace (Madrid)
 Santa María la Rica de Alcalá de Henares
 Iberdrola Tower of Bilbao 

 Louisiana State Museum» de Nueva Orleans 
 Museo Central de las Fuerzas Armadas Moscú 
  Museo Nacional de los Inválidos de París

Honours and awards

Honours

National honours

  Doctor honoris causa from the CEU San Pablo University.
  Academician of the Royal Academy of Fine Arts of Santa Isabel de Hungría (Seville).
  Gold Medal of Merit in the Fine Arts.
  Commander by Number of the Order of Isabella the Catholic.
  Knight Grand Cross of the Order of Naval Merit (with white decoration).
  Knight Grand Cross of the Order of Military Merit (with white decoration).
  Commander of the Order of Civil Merit.
  Silver Cross of the Order of Merit of the Civil Guard Corps.
  Cross of the Order of Naval Merit (with white decoration).
  Cross of the Order of Police Merit (with white decoration).
  Medal of Merit of Civil Defence (with white decoration).
  Medal of the 100º of the Virgen del Pilar as patron of the Civil Guard.

  Master of Honor of the Chivalry of San Fernando.
  Grand Cross of the Imperial Order of Charles V.
  Honorary Civil Guard.

Foreign honours
  NATO Medal for International Security Assistance Force. 
  Grand Star Serge Lazareff Prize. 
  Medal For International Cooperation Ministry of Foreign Affairs .
  Medal for merits in the Fight Against International Terrorism.
  Medal For International Cooperation the Ministry of Defense  
  General Kvinitadze Medal. ( Georgia)

Awards

National awards

Ambassador for “Marca Ejército” (Spanish Army Brand).
Academician of the Royal Academy of Saint Romualdo of Sciences, Letters and Arts (Cadiz).
 Academician of the Academy of Military Arts and Sciences.
Academic numerary of the Diplomacy Academy of the Kingdom of Spain.
Merit Cross of the Royal Association of Hidalgos of Spain.
Sabino Fernández Campo ABC y BBVA Awards.
Lancer of Honor of the Cavalry Regiment "Spain".
Lancer of Honor of the Cavalry Regiment "Farnesio".
Cavalier Almogávar Paratrooper of Honor.
Armored Soldier of Honor of the Armored Brigade Guadarrama XII.
Honorary Halberdier (Alabardero) of the Spanish Royal Guard.
Honorary Mountain Hunter of the Mountain Cavalry Regiment "America" No. 66.
Honorary Mountain Hunter of the Armored Cavalry Regiment "Alcántara" No. 10.
Honorary Arquebusier of Light Infantry Regiment «Soria» No. 9.
Honorary Member of the Infantry Regiment Asturias.
Honorary soldier of the RT 22
Honorary Húsar of Regiment Pavia.
Honorary Gunner of the RACA20.
Ferrer-Dalmau Awards of the Diplomacy Academy of the Kingdom of Spain.
Medal of the 350 Anniversary of the Asturias Infantry Regiment.

Commander of the Duque of Ahumada NCO Association.
Partner of Honor of "Círculo Ahumada de la Guardia Civil".
Partner of Honor of "Los Sitios de Zaragoza".
Partner of Honor of the "Círculo de Amigos de las Fuerzas Armadas".
Regular of Honor of G. R. Melilla 52.
Azor Award of the Infantry Brigade Airborne «Galicia» VII.
«Animosus Dux» of the Mechanized Infantry Brigade «Extremadura» XI.
Cross of Burgundy of the Spanish Heraldic Society. 
National prize «Living Culture» to the plastic arts.
"Mariblanca" Prize of the House of Madrid in Barcelona.
"Racimo" Painting Prize 2016.
Diploma of the General Inspectorate of the Army.
"Capitán de Galeones" Award of the "Fundación Puerta de América".

Foreign awards
 Member of «The International Society of War Artists».
Gold Medal and brilliants of the Arts «Art Priest».

Gallery

References

External links

War artists
1964 births
Living people
People from Barcelona
Spanish battle painters
20th-century Spanish painters
20th-century Spanish male artists
Spanish male painters
21st-century Spanish painters
21st-century Spanish male artists